Rudawa may refer to the following places in Poland:
Rudawa (river), a river in southern Poland
Rudawa, Lesser Poland Voivodeship (south Poland)
Rudawa, Kłodzko County in Lower Silesian Voivodeship (south-west Poland)
Rudawa, Wołów County in Lower Silesian Voivodeship (south-west Poland)
Rudawa, Świętokrzyskie Voivodeship (south-central Poland)
Rudawa, Opole Voivodeship (south-west Poland)